Madan Qaleh (also Romanized as Ma‘dan Qal‘eh and Ma‘dan-e Qal‘eh) is a village in Kuh Yakhab Rural District, Dastgerdan District, Tabas County, South Khorasan Province, Iran. At the 2006 census, its population was 47, in 11 families.

References 

Populated places in Tabas County